The Republican Left of Catalonia (ERC; ; generically branded as ) is a pro-Catalan independence, social-democratic political party in the Spanish autonomous community of Catalonia, with a presence also in Valencia, the Balearic Islands and the French department of Pyrénées-Orientales (Northern Catalonia). It is also the main sponsor of the independence movement from France and Spain in the territories known as Catalan Countries, focusing in recent years on the creation of a Catalan Republic in Catalonia proper. Its current president is Oriol Junqueras and its secretary-general is Marta Rovira. The party is a member of the European Free Alliance.

ERC, a party of relevant Catalan politicians including Francesc Macià, Lluís Companys and Josep Tarradellas, played an important role in Catalan and Spanish politics during the Second Republic, the Civil War, the anti-Francoist resistance and the transition to democracy. Recovering a key position during the 2000s, it became a coalition partner in various Catalan governments, obtaining in 2021 the presidency of Catalonia for the first time since 1980 after the appointment of Pere Aragonès as President of the Generalitat. It currently has approximately 10,000 members.

History

Republic and first Catalan self-government (1931–1936)

After the fall of Primo de Rivera (1930), the Catalan left made great efforts to create a united front under the leadership of left-wing independentist leader Francesc Macià. The Republican Left of Catalonia was founded on the Conference of the Catalan Left held in Sants, Barcelona, on 19 March 1931 as the union of the independentist Estat Català (Catalan State), led by Francesc Macià, the Catalan Republican Party, led by Lluís Companys and the L'Opinió Group of Joan Lluhí i Vallescà. The party had done extremely well in the municipal elections of 12 April 1931. Two days later, on 14 April, few hours before the proclamation of the Spanish Republic in Madrid, Macià proclaimed in Barcelona the Catalan Republic within the Iberian Federation. This was not exactly what had been agreed in the Pact of San Sebastián, so three days later they negotiated with the Madrid government that Macià would become president of the Generalitat of Catalonia, an autonomous Catalan government within the recently founded Spanish Republic.

In September 1932, the Spanish Republican Cortes approved the Statute of Autonomy of Catalonia which, among other provisions, granted a Catalan Parliament with full legislative powers, and it was elected on 20 November 1932. The Republican Left of Catalonia, in coalition with the Socialist Union of Catalonia and other minor left-wing parties, won a large majority of seats (67 of 85), while the previously hegemonic Regionalist League, representing a more conservative view of Catalan nationalism, came in second place but far behind ERC (17 from 85). From this strong position, the ERC sought to improve the living conditions of the popular classes and the petite bourgeoisie, approving laws in areas such as in culture, health, education and civil law, and the Crop Contracts Law, which protected tenant farmers and granted access to the land they were cultivating, but it was contested by the Regionalist League and provoking a legal dispute with the Spanish government. In October 1933, Joan Lluhí and other members of the l'Opinió Group, as well Josep Tarradellas, left ERC because there were in disagree with Macià over the distribution of powers between the Executive Council and the President of the Generalitat, and founded the Nationalist Republican Left Party (PNRE).

On 6 October 1934, Lluís Companys, who had been elected by the Parliament of Catalonia as the new President of the Generalitat after the death of Francesc Macià in December 1933, following the entry of right-wing ministers of the Spanish Confederation of the Autonomous Right (CEDA) into the Government of the Spanish Republic, unlawfully declared a Catalan State within a Spanish Federal Republic. CEDA was considered close to fascism and, therefore, it was feared that this was the first step towards suppressings the autonomy and taking complete power in Spain. The proclamation was quickly suppressed by the Spanish army, and the Catalan government was arrested. The party leaders (including Companys itself) and the Catalan government were sentenced by the Supreme Court of the Republic and jailed, while the Statute of Autonomy was suspended until February 1936.

In 1936, at the dawn of the Spanish Civil War, ERC became part of the Popular Front to contest that year's election. Esquerra became the leading force of the Popular Front, (called Front d'Esquerres, "Left Front" in Catalan) in Catalonia, which it won 41 from 54 Catalan seats, 21 of them belonging to ERC. The new left-wing Spanish government pardoned Companys and the members of the Catalan government, restoring the self-government. In June Estat Català split from ERC, while the PNRE rejoined it.

Civil War, Francoism and clandestinity (1936–1976)
During the Spanish Civil War ERC, as the leading force of the Generalitat, tried to maintain the unity of the Front in the face of growing tensions between the Workers' Party of Marxist Unification (POUM) and the pro-soviet Unified Socialist Party of Catalonia (PSUC), while struggled to recover the control of the situation, de facto controlled by the anarchist trade union CNT and their militias, and attempted to organize the war efforts in Catalonia. President Companys appointed Josep Tarradellas Conseller Primer (Prime Minister) in order to form a coalition government with the other Republican forces, including anarchists and communists. However, the party unsuccessfully tried to avoid the full control of Catalonia by the Republican government, enacted after the May Days event.

The party was declared illegal (along with all other participants in the Popular Front) by Francisco Franco after he came to power in 1939. The former president of the Catalan Generalitat, Lluís Companys, was arrested by Nazi German agents in collaboration with Vichy France, returned to Spain and executed on 15 October 1940 in Montjuïc Castle, Barcelona.

Since 1939, despite the weak situation of the party, almost disbanded after the Francoist occupation of Catalonia, ERC went underground and tried to organize anti-fascist resistance around Manuel Juliachs and Jaume Serra. In 1945, the ERC Congress, held in Toulouse since many ERC members lived in exile in France, appointed former Minister Josep Tarradellas as Secretary General, a position he left in 1954 when he was elected President of the Generalitat of Catalonia in exile, replacing Josep Irla. The office of General Secretary of ERC then passed to Joan Sauret. At the end of World War II, in view of a possible overthrow of Francoist Dictatorship with the intervention of the Allied forces, the direction of ERC in exile sent to Catalonia Pere Puig and Joan Rodríguez-Papasseit. During those years ERC was present at the Council of Catalan Democracy and the Council of Democratic Forces. In 1952 Heribert Barrera returned to the interior and assumes the direction of the party de facto. On 11 September 1964, the National Day of Catalonia, ERC and other groups organized the first anti-Franco demonstration since the end of the war. ERC participated successively in any initiative that confronts the Dictatorship.

Transition to democracy and the years of decline (1976–1987)

After the death of General Franco (1975), ERC celebrated in July 1976 the 8th National Congress, in which Barrera was confirmed as leader. In the election to Constituent Cortes of 1977, ERC went into coalition, as it was not yet legalized because of its status as a Republican party. ERC had requested registration in the register of political parties on 14 March of that year, but the Ministry of Interior - a month after the elections - responded: "The name proposed by the entity, referring to a political system incompatible with the one that is legally valid in Spain, can represent an assumption of inadmissibility ". The party tried a coalition with Left Front or with Democratic Convergence, although finally it allied with the Party of Labour of Spain. The name of the electoral coalition was Left of Catalonia–Democratic Electoral Front (Esquerra de Catalunya-Front Electoral Democràtic). The coalition won a seat (Barrera). Some of the electoral promises were the Statute of Autonomy or a referendum about the Monarchy.

In October 1977, President Josep Tarradellas (a founder of the party in 1931) returned to Catalonia and the Generalitat was restored. A new text of the Statute was drafted, which ERC opposed because it did not guarantee a minimum self-government. However, in the referendum for its approval, in 1979, ERC was in favour, as it was the only way to regain autonomy. In the first election to the restored Parliament of Catalonia, in 1980, ERC obtained 14 seats -of a total of 135-, which brought Barrera to the Presidency of the Parliament of Catalonia. At the crossroads of forming a tripartite with the PSUC and the socialists or favouring Convergència i Unió (CiU), Barrera—refractory to alliances with parties from a Marxist tradition—determined ERC would vote Jordi Pujol (CiU) as president of the Generalitat without compensation and without joining the government, as a gesture of "national unity". In 1984, however, ERC only obtained 5 deputies, and began a brief period of decline, overshadowed by the hegemony of the center-right Catalan nationalist coalition CiU. This trend persisted during the next years. In 1986, it lost its presence in the Spanish Cortes.

Recovering (1986–1996) 
In 1987, the National Call manifesto was published, signed by personalities like Àngel Colom and Josep-Lluís Carod-Rovira, who wanted ERC to bring together the new generation of independentists that aroses as a result of the disenchantment with the Spanish Transition. The entrance of these young people dynamizes the party, and in the Catalan election of 1988 obtained 6 seats. In 1989 a new direction led by Àngel Colom assumed the independence of Catalonia as a political aim. As a result of this new orientation, in 1990, the National Front of Catalonia, a historic organization founded in exile in 1940, joined ERC. In 1991, the organization Terra Lliure reconsidered its strategy, and abandoned the armed struggle, where some of its members joined ERC and many of those who formed Catalunya Lliure were incorporated too. These facts turned ERC, de facto, into the reference of the left-wing Catalan independentism.

The results obtained in the 1992 election to the Parliament of Catalonia placed ERC as the third political force of Catalonia, with the support of more than 210,000 voters and the obtaining of 11 seats, after a campaign in which, for the first time a party that appeared as a pro-independence party was widely popular. The 18th National Congress of ERC, held in June 1992, approved the reform of its statutes in the face of electoral growth, militancy and territorial presence. ERC advocates in its first statutory article the territorial unity and independence of the Catalan Countries, building its own state within the European framework and together with an ideological position of the left that takes the defense of democracy and environment, human rights and rights of the peoples, and based its ideology and political action on social progress and solidarity.

In the 1993 Spanish general election ERC recovered its presence in the Congress of Deputies. The same year, Jordi Carbonell and Avel·lí Artís i Gener "Tísner", Left Nationalists members, joined ERC. The local elections of 28 May 1995 represented an important quantitative and qualitative leap of the institutional presence of the party. ERC recovered the presence in many local councils of Catalonia, reaching more than 550 elected councillors and 32 mayors, and thus becomes the third municipal political force. In the 1995 Catalan election, ERC obtained the best result in number of votes since the Republic era, more than 305,000 voters and 13 seats.

In 1996, after a serious internal crisis, Àngel Colom, along with Pilar Rahola left the party and founded the Independence Party. This party, however, had a short life. In the local elections of 1999 they obtained poor results and Pilar Rahola, who presented himself as head of the list in Barcelona, did not obtain a seat. After that the party was dissolved.

New era with Carod Rovira and return to the Government  

In November 1996, the 21st National Congress of ERC was held. The militants chose a new direction for the party, with Josep Lluís Carod-Rovira as new president and Joan Puigcercós as new general secretary. The new direction announced some changes on the strategy: it does not renounce the independence of Catalonia, but it stops using that idea as the only reference. The new direction wanted to place the party as the new reference of the Catalan left.

On 16 November 2003, in the election to the Parliament of Catalonia, ERC obtained 23 seats, becoming the "key party" that would define the composition of the government, since to obtain the majority the other parties were obliged to agree with ERC. After several weeks in which it seemed that he would close an agreement with CiU (center-right and nationalist party), it finally opted for a "progressive pact" (called the Pact of the Tinell or popularly the "Tripartit") with the Socialists' Party of Catalonia and the ecosocialist coalition ICV-EUiA.

ERC became part of the tripartite government of the Generalitat, chaired by the socialist Pasqual Maragall, assuming six government departments, among which the "Conseller en Cap" (Prime Minister), belonging to Carod-Rovira. The other five ministries assumed by ERC were Education (Josep Bargalló), Welfare and Family (Anna Simó), Commerce, Tourism and Consumption (Pere Esteve), Government and Public Administration (Joan Carretero) and Universities, Research and Information Society (Carles Solà). In addition, another ERC leader, Ernest Benach, was elected President of the Parliament.

Despite having been one of the main forces behind the movement for amendment, the party eventually opposed the 2006 changes to the Catalan Statute of Autonomy to increase Catalonia's autonomy. It did so on the grounds that it did not do enough to increase Catalan self-government. This caused a government crisis with its partners (specially with the PSC) which led to an early election in 2006.

Political principles and representation

Its basic political principles are defined in the Statement of Ideology approved at the 19th National Congress in 1993. This is organised into the three areas that give the organisation its name: Esquerra (commitment to the Left's agenda in the political, economic and social debate), República (commitment to the Republican form of government vs. Spain's current constitutional monarchy) and Catalunya (Catalan independentism, which, as understood by ERC, comprises the Catalan Countries).

The party is also federated with parties in the Balearic Islands and in Northern Catalonia in France, as well as with Republican Left of the Valencian Country in the Valencian Community. Except for their Balearic counterpart, none of the latter currently have any parliamentary representation in their respective territories, though they do have 8 municipal councillors in the Balearic Islands and 6 councillors in the Valencian Community. Occitan Republican Left, formed in 2008, acts as the Aranese section of the party.

The Republican Left of Catalonia is the oldest political party in Catalan politics that has supported the idea of a sovereign Catalan nation for the entirety of its existence. From the inception of ERC in 1931, they have always been in favor of
statehood for Catalonia.

After the last Catalan parliamentary election in 2021, the Republican Left of Catalonia has 33 seats in the Parliament of Catalonia, making it the largest group by number of seats, tied with the PSC, and second in number of votes. It also has one seat in the Balearic Parliament. Until 2010, it was one of the three coalition members of the tripartite left-wing Catalan Government, together with Socialists' Party of Catalonia (PSC) and Initiative for Catalonia Greens (ICV). The coalition was often uneasy due to tensions related to the new Statute of Autonomy of Catalonia. The snap election on 25 November 2012 saw ERC rise to a total of 21 seats in the Catalan Parliament. Out of Catalonia, it has thirteen seats (fifth largest group) in the Spanish Parliament, eleven seats in the Senate (third largest group) and two seats in the European Parliament.

Presidents 

Francesc Macià (1931–1933)
Lluís Companys (1933–1935)
Carles Pi i Sunyer (1933–1935)
Lluís Companys (1936–1940)
Heribert Barrera (1993–1995)
Jaume Campabadal (1995–1996)
Jordi Carbonell (1996–2004)
Josep-Lluís Carod-Rovira (2004–2008)
Joan Puigcercós (2008–2011)
Oriol Junqueras (2011–present)

General Secretaries 

Joan Lluís Pujol i Font (March 1931 – April 1931)
Josep Tarradellas (April 1931 – March 1932)
Joan Tauler (March 1932 – 1938)
Josep Tarradellas (1938 – 1957)
Joan Sauret (1957–1976)
Heribert Barrera (1976–1987)
Joan Hortalà (1987–1989)
Àngel Colom Colom (1989–1996)
Josep-Lluís Carod-Rovira (1996–2004)
Joan Puigcercós (2004–2008)
Joan Ridao i Martín (2008–2011)
Marta Rovira i Vergés (2011–present)

Electoral performance

Parliament of Catalonia

Parliament of the Balearic Islands

Cortes Generales

Nationwide

Regional breakdown

European Parliament

See also
List of political parties in Catalonia
Republican Youth of Catalonia
Statute of Autonomy of Catalonia

Notes

References

Sources

External links 

 
Ideological declaration  
ERC's brief history  
Joventuts de l'Esquerra Republicana de Catalunya Youth section's site 

 
Political parties in the Balearic Islands
Political parties in Northern Catalonia
Catalan independence movement
Pro-independence parties
Political parties established in 1931
Secessionist organizations in Europe
European Free Alliance
Socialist parties in Catalonia
Social democratic parties in Spain
1931 establishments in Spain